Christopher Dagpin is a Filipino international lawn bowler.

Bowls career
Dagpin was selected as part of the five man team by the Philippines for the 2020 World Outdoor Bowls Championship, which was due to be held in the Gold Coast, Australia.

He won a fours bronze medal (with Angelo Morales, Leo Carreon and Ronald Lising), at the 2009 Asia Pacific Bowls Championships, held in Kuala Lumpur. In 2014, he won the Hong Kong International Bowls Classic pairs title with Angelo Morales.

References

Living people
Filipino male lawn bowls players
Year of birth missing (living people)
Southeast Asian Games medalists in lawn bowls
Competitors at the 2005 Southeast Asian Games
Southeast Asian Games silver medalists for the Philippines